Scythris cycladeae is a moth of the family Scythrididae. It was described by Eberhard Jäckh in 1978. It is found in Greece (Naxos Island, the Cyclades).

References

cycladeae
Moths described in 1978